The Autoridade de Segurança Alimentar e Económica - ASAE (English: Economic and Food Safety Authority) is a specialized authority responsible for food safety and economic surveillance in Portugal. ASAE is a national authority, with administrative autonomy, that acts as a police and law enforcement body.

References

Regulators of Portugal
Food safety organizations